A Time to Heal is a quotation from the Bible.

It may refer to:
A Time to Heal (film), a 1994 television film
A Time to Heal (Star Trek), a 2004 novel by David Mack set in the fictional universe of Star Trek: The Next Generation
A Time to Heal (1979 book), title of the 1979 autobiography of U.S. President Gerald Ford

Hebrew Bible words and phrases